Cal Niday (April 29, 1914 in Turlock, California – February 14, 1988 in Lancaster, California) was an American racecar driver. He lost his leg in a motorcycle accident after high school, but it did not affect his race car driving career. Cal is also noted as the first racer to wear a modern style Bell helmet in the Indy 500. Niday is one of three drivers to have participated in the Indianapolis 500 with a prosthetic leg. The Indianapolis 500 was part of the FIA World Championship from 1950 through 1960. Drivers competing at Indy during those years were credited with World Championship points and participation.  During his racing career, Niday travelled to Australia to race Midgets (known as Speedcars in Australia). In 1948 Niday won the 3rd running of the Australian Speedcar Grand Prix at the famous Sydney Showground Speedway. Cal Niday participated in three World Championship races but scored no World Championship points. He was killed by a heart-attack after being thrown from a vintage open wheeler at Willow Springs raceway.

Indianapolis 500 results

References

1914 births
1988 deaths
Indianapolis 500 drivers
People from Turlock, California
Racing drivers from California